Charles Kahoalii Aiu III (May 22, 1954—December 28, 2001) was an American football guard who played for the San Diego Chargers and Seattle Seahawks. He played college football at University of Hawaii.

References 

1954 births
2001 deaths
Players of American football from Honolulu
American football offensive linemen
San Diego Chargers players
Seattle Seahawks players
Hawaii Rainbow Warriors football players